

Ernst Meiners (13 June 1893 – 11 June 1959) was a German general during World War II. He was a recipient of the Knight's Cross of the Iron Cross of Nazi Germany.

Awards and decorations

 Knight's Cross of the Iron Cross on 17 December 1943 as Oberst der Reserve and commander of Grenadier-Regiment 161

References

Citations

Bibliography

 

1893 births
1959 deaths
Military personnel from Berlin
Major generals of the German Army (Wehrmacht)
German Army personnel of World War I
Recipients of the clasp to the Iron Cross, 1st class
Recipients of the Gold German Cross
Recipients of the Knight's Cross of the Iron Cross
German prisoners of war in World War II held by the Soviet Union
People from the Province of Brandenburg
German Army generals of World War II